Hampiholi is a village on the banks of river Malaprabha in Belgaum district,  from Ramdurga taluk in the southern state of Karnataka, India.

References

Villages in Belagavi district